Washington Junction is a station on Pittsburgh Regional Transit's light rail network. It is located in Bethel Park, Pennsylvania. The facility is designed both as a transfer station for southbound travelers (the Red and Blue Lines continue toward Upper St. Clair and South Hills Village, while the Silver Line continues toward South Park and Library), and as a commuter park and ride facility. 230 spaces are located on site, designed for allowing travel to Downtown Pittsburgh by residents of northern Bethel Park and commuters who choose to use the stop by traveling from more eastern suburbs via Library or Broughton Roads.

History
Washington Junction was once an important junction on the Pittsburgh Railways Interurban service where the lines from Pittsburgh to Washington, PA and Roscoe, PA joined.

References

External links 

Port Authority T Stations Listings
Station from Google Maps Street View

Port Authority of Allegheny County stations
Railway stations in the United States opened in 1903
Blue Line (Pittsburgh)
Red Line (Pittsburgh)
Silver Line (Pittsburgh)